The Jinan Hundred Miles Yellow River Scenic Area is a public park located on the southern bank of the Yellow River in the city of Jinan, Shandong, China. It covers an elongated strip of land between the second northern ring road around the city and the bank of the Yellow River.
From within the park, the Yellow River can be crossed via the Luokou pontoon bridge. On the opposite bank of the river lies the Yellow River Forest Park.

See also
Yellow River Forest Park
Three Officials Temple Scenic Area
List of sites in Jinan

References

Tourist attractions in Jinan
Yellow River